The Free Public Library of Kaukauna is affiliated with the Outagamie Waupaca Library System. It was added to the National Register of Historic Places in 1984 for its significance in education and community planning and development.

References

Government buildings completed in 1905
Library buildings completed in 1905
Kaukauna
Kaukauna
Prairie School architecture in Wisconsin
Kaukauna
National Register of Historic Places in Outagamie County, Wisconsin
1905 establishments in Wisconsin